Gamma Eta is the first social sorority to be founded in the State of Florida. Eighteen women came together to create the sorority at the University of Florida in Gainesville on October 18, 1995. Gamma Eta was chartered and incorporated on August 2, 1999.

Gamma Eta is composed of college-educated women of diverse cultural backgrounds, including Caucasian, Hispanic, African, Asian, Middle Eastern (West Asia), and Indian.

Gamma Eta is a part of the National Multicultural Greek Council.

History

Founding

In the years leading up to 1995, there were many questions regarding the role of the Latino community at the University of Florida. There was a low retention rate for Latino students and a large cultural disconnect at the University of Florida campus. In direct response to those issues, the Founding Mothers led the efforts to create Gamma Eta for women of diverse backgrounds to provide a social and academic support system.

Gamma Eta Society
First known as Gamma Eta Society, the founding mothers faced numerous barriers in becoming formally recognized as an official sorority. Despite these obstacles, the founders initiated the first Founding Class in the Spring of 1996. A few months after Gamma Eta's incorporation, the sorority was admitted to the local Multicultural Greek Council as an Associate Member on November 22, 1999.

Pillars of success
 Sisterhood
 Strength
 Unity
 Diversity
 Scholarship
 Leadership
 Service

Chapters
Active chapters noted in bold, inactive chapters noted in italics.

Undergraduate chapters

Alumnae chapters 
 Alpha Chi Alpha – Greater Miami
 Alpha Chi Beta – North Florida
 Alpha Chi Gamma – Orlando
 Alpha Chi Delta – Northwest Arkansas
 Alpha Chi Epsilon – Washington, D.C.
 Alpha Chi Zeta – Gainesville

Philanthropy
Gamma Eta's national philanthropy is breast cancer awareness in official partnership with the National Breast Cancer Foundation. Individual chapters at the collegiate and alumnae levels also support a secondary philanthropy.

References

External links
 Gamma Eta Sorority, Inc. National Website

Student societies in the United States
1995 establishments in Florida
National Multicultural Greek Council
Organizations established in 1995